A Good Night to Die is a 2003 American action comedy thriller film directed by Craig Singer and starring Michael Rapaport, Gary Stretch, Ally Sheedy, Ralph Macchio, Debbie Harry, Robin Givens, Seymour Cassel, Frank Whaley and Lainie Kazan.

Cast
Michael Rapaport as August
Gary Stretch as Ronnie
Robin Givens as Dana
Ally Sheedy as Marie
Ralph Macchio as Donnie
Debbie Harry as Madison
Seymour Cassel as Guy
Lainie Kazan as Diane
Frank Whaley as Chad
James Russo as Roy
Reg E. Cathey as Avi

References

External links
 
 

American action comedy films
American comedy thriller films
2000s English-language films
2000s American films